Ľubomír Malina (born August 15, 1991) is a Slovak professional ice hockey defenceman who currently plays professionally in Slovakia for HK Spišská Nová Ves of the Slovak Extraliga.

Career statistics

Regular season and playoffs

References

External links
 

1991 births
Living people
Slovak ice hockey defencemen
People from Kežmarok
Sportspeople from the Prešov Region
HK Poprad players
HK Spišská Nová Ves players
HC ZUBR Přerov players
AZ Havířov players
MsHK Žilina players
Slovak expatriate ice hockey players in the Czech Republic